Turpan North railway station is a railway station on the Lanzhou–Xinjiang high-speed railway, serving the city of Turpan in Xinjiang, China. The station is located about 10 km northwest from the city center, very close to the Turpan Jiaohe Airport.

Turpan North railway station is located much closer to the city than the older Turpan railway station, on the older "conventional"  Lanzhou–Xinjiang railway.

Railway stations in Xinjiang
Railway stations in China opened in 2014